ShowSize is a disk space analyzer for Microsoft Windows that shows the disk space occupied by various items on a disk. It was first developed as a DOS application and was released on CompuServe forums in 1995.

ShowSize produces many reports to help find out the disk space occupied by various items such as folders, file types, and file owners. It also has some flat reports that give a unique perspective on the file system (for example only files and only folders). Since these flat reports can be very big for modern huge disks, they are shown by using a virtual list to minimize the memory usage by the program.

Features
Folder sizes report
File types report
File owners report
Pie chart of largest items 
Folders and files report
Active modified folders report
Only folders flat report
Only files flat report
Command line usage from batch files
Exclude folders feature to save on scanning time of huge disks

References

Notes

Article on Preventive Computer Maintenance
CNet Review

External links

Disk usage analysis software